This article provides an overview of Japanese football in the year 1961. In 1961, the Japan national football team went 2-5 in international play.

Emperor's Cup

National team

Results

Players statistics

External links

 
Seasons in Japanese football